Sonny Patrick Laiton (born 28 January 2000) is a French professional footballer who plays for  club Stade Briochin on loan from AJ Auxerre as a goalkeeper.

Club career
On 3 November 2017, Laiton signed his first professional contract with AJ Auxerre. He made his professional debut with AJ Auxerre in a 3–1 Coupe de la Ligue win over Gazélec Ajaccio on 14 August 2018.

References

External links
 
 
 
 

2000 births
French people of Réunionnais descent
French sportspeople of Malagasy descent
Black French sportspeople
People from Saint-Louis, Réunion
Footballers from Réunion
Living people
Association football goalkeepers
French footballers
France youth international footballers
AJ Auxerre players
Stade Briochin players
Ligue 2 players
Championnat National players
Championnat National 2 players
Championnat National 3 players